Calvin Hunt may refer to:

 Calvin Hunt (artist) (born 1956), Canadian First Nations artist
 Calvin Hunt (American football) (born 1947), former American football player
 Calvin Hunt (singer) (1957–2009), American Christian singer